Lawrence Kilner Smith (born 6 January 1964) is an English former cricketer who played first-class and List A cricket for Worcestershire. He later played at minor counties level for Wiltshire, and made a single List A appearance for that county. He also went on Minor Counties' tour of South Africa in 1993–94.

Smith's professional career was not particularly successful: in his few first-team appearances for Worcestershire, his highest score was the 28 he made on debut against Cambridge University,
while his solitary success with the ball was the wicket of Warwickshire wicket-keeper Geoff Humpage on Smith's final first-class appearance in July 1987.

Smith's only half-century in senior cricket came for Wiltshire against Durham in the first round of the 1993 NatWest Trophy; opening the batting, he top-scored with 73, but his innings was not enough to avoid a 103-run defeat.

His father David Smith played over 100 times, mainly for Derbyshire, between the mid-1960s and the early 1970s.

References

External links

1964 births
Living people
English cricketers
Worcestershire cricketers
Wiltshire cricketers
Sportspeople from Mirfield
Cricketers from Yorkshire